Saidou Kébé (born 16 August 1976 in Dakar) is a Senegalese footballer. He plays for La Chaux-de-Fonds.

Kébé has been played in Switzerland for almost ten years.

He joined La Chaux-de-Fonds in February 2005 after released by SR Delémont in summer 2004.

External links

http://www.football.ch/sfl/777820/de/Kader.aspx?tId=0&pId=111577

1976 births
Living people
Senegalese footballers
Senegalese expatriate footballers
Senegal international footballers
FC Locarno players
SR Delémont players
FC Zürich players
FC La Chaux-de-Fonds players
Expatriate footballers in Switzerland
Swiss Super League players
Association football defenders
Footballers from Dakar